Tielt-Antwerp-Tielt was a men's cycling race organised for the last time in 1968. The race was run between Tielt (West Flanders) and Antwerp. In 1945, a shortened version of 144 km was run with start place Antwerp and finish place Tielt. In 1958, Antwerp was both start and finish place.

The competition's roll of honor includes the successes of Briek Schotte and Rik Van Looy.

Winners

References 

Cycle races in Belgium
1938 establishments in Belgium
Defunct cycling races in Belgium
Recurring sporting events established in 1938
Recurring sporting events disestablished in 1968
1968 disestablishments in Belgium